Oestrus is a genus of bot flies, from the family Oestridae

The genus includes the sheep bot fly (O. ovis Linnaeus, 1758) that is a major pest in the Australian sheep industry.

About 34 species are in the genus.

Species 
Genus: Oestrus Linnaeus, 1758
Oestrus ovis Linnaeus, 1758

References 

Oestridae
Oestroidea genera
Parasitic flies
Taxa named by Carl Linnaeus